Tiltill Valley is a remote valley in northern Yosemite National Park.  It is accessible only to hikers and equestrians.  The valley is most easily reached via trail heads in the vicinity of the Hetch Hetchy Valley and Lake Eleanor.  The valley provides access to many remote alpine lakes throughout the largely untamed wilderness that defines the northern portion of Yosemite National Park and the adjacent Emigrant Wilderness.

References

Landforms of Yosemite National Park
Valleys of Tuolumne County, California
Valleys of California